Richard Kruse (born 30 July 1983) is a former British right-handed foil fencer and four-time Olympian. In 2015, he was part of the Great Britain team that shocked Olympic champions Italy to win the first European Games gold in team foil, the first British gold medal in a team fencing event at World or European level for fifty years. He retired in 2021.

Career
Kruse won his first international medal, a silver, at the 2001 European Under 20 Championships and in 2002 won gold in at the same event.

He made his Olympic debut at the 2004 Games in Athens, Greece. Competing in the men's individual foil. He received a bye in the first round, beat China's Wang Haibin in round two and Dan Kellner of the United States in the third round before being defeated 8–15 by Andrea Cassarà in the quarter-finals. His eighth-place finish was the best by a British fencer since the 1992 Summer Olympics in Barcelona, when Fiona McIntosh was eighth in the women's foil, and the best by a British man since the 1964 Summer Olympics in Tokyo, when Bill Hoskyns won the silver medal in the individual épée. In 2006 Kruse won the silver medal in the men's foil event at the European Fencing Championships.

At the 2008 Summer Olympics in Beijing, China, Kruse again participated in the men's individual foil event. He defeated Virgil Sălișcan of Romania in the round of 32 but was eliminated at the last 16 stage after a 9–10 loss to Germany's Peter Joppich. He finished 14th.

In 2009 Kruse had his most successful season to date. He won a gold medal at the World Cup event in Copenhagen and a silver medal in Paris, then gold in Venice before winning a silver medal at the 2009 European Fencing Championships held in Plovdiv, Bulgaria. Kruse finished the season ranked fourth in the world.

At the 2011 World Cup event in Seoul, South Korea, Kruse won the silver medal in the men's foil. he won five matches, including a 15–11 defeat of compatriot Laurence Halsted in the last eight to reach the final against Andrea Baldini of Italy. Baldini won the final by a single point, 15–14 to take the gold medal.

Kruse is coached by former Polish Olympian turned British national Ziemowit Wojciechowski. He is also a coach for his ZFW fencing club.

In 2012, Richard Kruse won bronze at the Wakayama Grand Prix. Only 2 months later he claimed another bronze at the European Championships in Legnano, having been seeded 45th after the poule stages. At the London Olympics later that year, he finished 17th in the men's individual event, losing to Artur Akhmatkhuzin in the last 32. He was part of the British team that came 6th, losing to Italy in the quarter-finals and then beating France and losing to Russia in the ranking rounds.

In 2016 Kruse again attended the Olympic Games in Rio. He placed fourth overall in the Men's Individual Foil, losing to Timur Safin of Russia in the Bronze Medal Match.

In 2018 Kruse won silver in the individual men's foil event at the World Championships in Wuxi, China.

After winning gold at the Prince Takamodo World Cup in Tokyo, on 26 January 2019, he was ranked number one in the world, the first British fencer to achieve that position.

Kruse retired in May 2021. He now works as a fencing coach for Salle Paul Fencing Club in Hendon. When he retired in 2021, he had been a six times British fencing champion, winning six foil titles at the British Fencing Championships, from 2001 to 2018.

Medal Record

World Championship

European Championship

Grand Prix

World Cup

References

1983 births
Living people
British male foil fencers
Olympic fencers of Great Britain
Fencers at the 2004 Summer Olympics
Fencers at the 2008 Summer Olympics
Fencers at the 2012 Summer Olympics
Sportspeople from London
Fencers at the 2015 European Games
European Games medalists in fencing
European Games gold medalists for Great Britain
Fencers at the 2016 Summer Olympics